The 1989 NAIA Division I football season was the 34th season of college football sponsored by the NAIA, was the 20th season of play of the NAIA's top division for football.

The season was played from August to November 1989 and culminated in the 1989 NAIA Champion Bowl playoffs and the 1989 NAIA Champion Bowl, played this year on December 16, 1989 again at Burke–Tarr Stadium in Jefferson City, Tennessee, on the campus of Carson–Newman College.

Carson–Newman defeated Emporia State in the Champion Bowl, 34–20, to win their fifth, and second consecutive, NAIA national title. It was the Eagles' fourth straight appearance in the Champion Bowl, going 2–1 in the previous two.

Conference realignment

Membership changes

Conference standings

Conference champions

Postseason

See also
 1989 NCAA Division I-A football season
 1989 NCAA Division I-AA football season
 1989 NCAA Division II football season
 1989 NCAA Division III football season

References

 
NAIA Football National Championship